Boshiamy (sometimes written , a Mandarin approximation of the Taiwanese phrase , meaning "It's nothing!") is a Chinese character input method editor (IME). It was invented by Liu Chung-tz'u.

Boshiamy uses about 300 radicals represented by 26 letters to build characters. Radicals are mapped to letters by their shapes, sounds or meanings.

Boshiamy has become one of the fastest input methods by shortening codes of many characters. Speeds exceeding 200 characters per minute have been achieved in typing contests. Boshiamy was originally designed to input traditional Chinese characters, but now it also supports simplified Chinese character input. However, it is commercial software, and users may not be able to use it on some computers. A trial version with fewer characters is available on the official site.

Categories of radicals
The inventor of Boshiamy divided radicals into several categories as a mnemonic for learners to master radicals. All categories of radicals are treated equally in practice.

Shapes

Some radicals are mapped to letters with similar shapes.

Sounds

Some radicals are mapped to letters by their sounds.

Meanings

Some radicals are mapped to the first letters of their English meanings.

Variants 

Some radicals look similar to other radicals, and are mapped to the same letter.

Others

A few radicals are mapped to letters arbitrarily.

Rules of character input

Order 
Characters are decomposed into what users call "eye order", that is essentially from left to right, from top to bottom. Because of the numerous radicals available, decomposition is not difficult.

Supplementary letter 
The first three and the last radical of a character are taken as its code. If there are less than three letters, a supplementary letter is added according to the shape of the last stroke of character.

Selection 
In case more than one character correspond to the same code, an extra letter can be added for selection. Characters can also be selected by number keys.

Shortening of code 

To increase input speed, a number of most common characters are given shorter codes of one or two letters. For example,  (originally PDNA) is D,  (FEBA) is A,  (AQD) is AD.

Additional "brevity radicals" are made available for shortening the codes of more characters.

Boshiamy provides a special input mode for users to master these short codes. In this mode, users can only input a character by its shortest code, otherwise it does not output the character, but instead shows users the character alongside its shortest code.

Other features 

Boshiamy supports Unicode. Zhuyin, Japanese kanji and kana, and other special symbols can be input directly with Boshiamy. Users can add new codes for characters or phrases.

See also
 Chinese input methods for computers

External links 
  Official site of Boshiamy 

Han character input